There have been three baronetcies created for persons with the surname Paget, all in the Baronetage of the United Kingdom, and a fourth created for the Bayly, which later became the Paget Baronetcy. As of 2016, two of the creations are extant.

The Paget Baronetcy, of Harewood Place in the County of Middlesex, was created in the Baronetage of the United Kingdom on 19 August 1871 for the surgeon and pathologist James Paget. The Right Reverend Francis Paget, second son of the first Baronet, was Bishop of Oxford. His son Sir Bernard Paget was a general in the British Army. The latter was the father of the fourth Baronet. Stephen Paget, another son of the first Baronet, was also a noted surgeon. As of 2016 the title is held by his great-great-grandson, the fifth Baronet, who succeeded his father, in 2016. The fourth baronet was a lieutenant-colonel in the British Army and author. He wrote The Yeoman of the Guard (1984), Second to none: the Coldstream Guards, 1650–2000 (2000), and a number of other military histories. He served in the Coldstream Guards from 1940 to 1968 and was a Gentleman Usher to Queen Elizabeth II from 1971 to 1991, and an Extra Gentleman Usher from 1991.

The Paget Baronetcy, of Cranmore Hall in the parish of East Cranmore in the County of Somerset, was created in the Baronetage of the United Kingdom on 6 March 1886 for the Conservative politician Richard Paget. The second Baronet was married to Lady Muriel Paget, and had issue, including the third Baronet. He was also a great-grandfather of the actress Anna Chancellor through his daughter Sylvia, Lady Chancellor (wife of Christopher Chancellor) and her elder son John.

The Paget Baronetcy, of Sutton Bonington in the County of Nottingham, was created in the Baronetage of the United Kingdom on 25 September 1897 Ernest Paget, Chairman of the Midland Railway. The second Baronet was a locomotive engineer and railway administrator. The title became extinct on his death in 1936.

Bayly, later Paget baronets, of Plas Newydd (1730)
Sir Edward Bayly, 1st Baronet (d. 1741)
Sir Nicholas Bayly, 2nd Baronet (1709–1782)
Sir Henry Bayly Paget, 3rd Baronet (1744–1812) (succeeded as Baron Paget in 1769)

See Marquess of Anglesey for further succession.

Paget baronets, of Harewood Place (1871) 
Sir James Paget, 1st Baronet (1814–1899)
Sir John Rahere Paget, 2nd Baronet (1848–1938)
Sir James Francis Paget, 3rd Baronet (1890–1972)
Sir Julian Tolver Paget, 4th Baronet CVO (1921–2016)
Sir Henry James Paget, 5th Baronet (born 1959)

The heir apparent is the present holder's son Bernard Halfdan Paget (born 1994).

Paget baronets, of Cranmore Hall (1886) 
Sir Richard Horner Paget, 1st Baronet (1832–1908)
Sir Richard Arthur Surtees Paget, 2nd Baronet (1869–1955)
Sir John Starr Paget, 3rd Baronet (1914–1992)
Sir Richard Herbert Paget, 4th Baronet (born 1957)

The heir presumptive is the present holder's brother David Vernon John Paget (born 1959).
The heir presumptive's heir apparent is his only son Alexander Lachlan John Paget (born 1994).

Paget baronets, of Sutton Bonington (1897) 
Sir (George) Ernest Paget, 1st Baronet (1841–1923)
Sir Cecil Walter Paget, 2nd Baronet (1874–1936)

Notes

References
Kidd, Charles, Williamson, David (editors). Debrett's Peerage and Baronetage (1990 edition). New York: St Martin's Press, 1990, 

Baronetcies in the Baronetage of the United Kingdom
Extinct baronetcies in the Baronetage of the United Kingdom